In mathematics, especially in algebraic geometry, a quartic surface is a surface defined by an equation of degree 4.

More specifically there are two closely related types of quartic surface: affine and projective.  An affine quartic surface is the solution set of an equation of the form

This is a surface in affine space .

On the other hand, a projective quartic surface is a surface in projective space  of the same form, but now  is a homogeneous polynomial of 4 variables of degree 4, so for example .

If on the other hand the base field is finite, then it is said to be an arithmetic quartic surface.

Special quartic surfaces
 Dupin cyclides
 The Fermat quartic, given by x4 + y4 + z4 + w4 =0 (an example of a K3 surface). 
 More generally, certain K3 surfaces are examples of quartic surfaces.
 Kummer surface
 Plücker surface
 Weddle surface

See also
Quadric surface (The union of two quadric surfaces is a special case of a quartic surface)
Cubic surface (The union of a cubic surface and a plane is another particular type of quartic surface)

References

Complex surfaces
Algebraic surfaces